also well known as Akamatsu Enshin was a Japanese samurai of the Akamatsu clan in the Muromachi period. He was governor (shugo) of Harima Province in Hyōgo Prefecture.

Warrior
Norimura supported Emperor Go-Daigo and Ashikaga Takauji in the struggle to overcome the Kamakura shogunate.   Akamatsu joined Takauji in capturing Kyoto from imperial forces on 23 Feb. 1336.  He then became a part of the Ashikaga shogunate. Before the Battle of Minatogawa, his Shirahata castle was surrounded by Emperor Go-Daigo's large force led by Nitta Yoshisada but he held the castle over 50 days it helped Ashikaga Takauji regroup its forces in Kyushu. Norimura constructed a fort on a hill which later became the site for Himeji Castle.

Patron
Norimura was a patron of Sesson Yūbai who established Hōun-ji and Hōrin-ji in Harima.  In records about the establishment of land rights for Daitoku-ji in Kyoto, Norimura's help is recognized.

External links
History of Himeji Castle

References

1277 births
1350 deaths
Daimyo